Gedung Sate is a public building in Bandung, West Java, Indonesia. It was designed according to a neoclassical design incorporating native Indonesian elements (such as Hindu-Buddhist elements) by Dutch architect J. Gerber to be the seat of the Dutch East Indies department of State Owned Enterprises (Departement van Gouvernmentsbedrijven, literally "Department of Government Industries"); the building was completed in 1920. Today, the building serves as the seat of the governor of the province of West Java, and also a museum.

Its common name, Gedung sate, is a nickname that translates literally from Indonesian to 'satay building', which is a reference to the shape of the building's central pinnacle - which resemble the shape of one of the Indonesian traditional dish called satay. The central pinnacle consists of six spheres that represent the six million gulden funded to the construction of the building.

See also

Indonesian architecture
List of colonial buildings in Bandung
New Indies Style

References

Buildings and structures in Bandung
Dutch colonial architecture in Indonesia
Cultural Properties of Indonesia in West Java